Tae Bo is a body fitness system that incorporates martial arts techniques, such as kicks and punches, which became popular in the 1990s. It was developed by African-American taekwondo practitioner Billy Blanks. Such programs use the motions of martial arts at a rapid pace designed to promote fitness.

Name
The name Tae Bo is a portmanteau of taekwondo and boxing.

History
Billy Blanks developed the routine in 1976 by combining dance with elements from his martial arts and boxing training to form a workout regimen. During the 1990s, a series of videos was mass-marketed to the public; by 1999, an estimated 1.5 million sets of videos had been sold by frequently-aired television infomercials. As a result, Tae Bo became something of a pop culture phenomenon in the late 1990s. Gyms began offering kickboxing-based fitness classes similar to Tae Bo. Since Blanks had obtained a trademark on the name they were not allowed to use the term Tae Bo without paying a licensing fee. Tae Bo videos and DVDs continue to rank among the top sellers in the fitness genre and derivative classes are still offered at many gyms.

Tae Bo classes are taught worldwide. It includes many of the same punches and kicks as karate, but is not intended for fighting — it was not meant for any combat or self-defense activities. There are no throws, grappling moves, or ground fighting techniques in Tae Bo. Its only intent is to increase fitness through movement. It also includes aerobic exercises intended to strengthen all muscles of the body with basic choreography. The high-intensity workout is intended to increase cardiovascular fitness, strength, muscular endurance, and flexibility.

Benefits
Tae Bo has been characterized as an excellent cardiovascular workout with very good distractions.

Due to the movements it involves, Tae Bo is effective in toning and defining the body's musculature. It can also improve one's balance, flexibility, and coordination. According to Blanks, the cardiovascular benefits are a result of the dance moves added to the already high-energy workout. An hour-long Tae Bo workout will burn 500 to 800 calories, compared with the 300 to 400 calories burned with a more conventional aerobics class.

References

Physical exercise
Exercise organizations
Exercise-related trademarks
1990s fads and trends